is a Japanese voice actress represented by I'm Enterprise. She is best known for her anime roles, which include Hitagi Senjougahara in Monogatari, Homura Akemi in Puella Magi Madoka Magica, Yona in Akatsuki no Yona, Chloe von Eizenbern in Fate/kaleid liner Prisma Illya, Caster (Tamamo-no-Mae and her variants) in Fate/Grand Order series, Aika S. Granzchesta in Aria, and Jean in Genshin Impact and Aoi Asahina in the Danganronpa video games and anime.

Personal life
Chiwa announced on July 29, 2013 that she had gotten married, and announced in October 2015 that she had given birth to her first child, a daughter.

Filmography

TV Series
1999
Orphen: The Revenge, Remi (ep. 1)

2001
Kokoro Library, Kokoro

2002
Panyo Panyo Di Gi Charat, Mermaid Princess

2003
R.O.D -The TV-, Anita King
Inuyasha, Village Maiden 2 (ep. 129)
Kino's Journey, Daughter (ep. 3)
Popotan, Magical Girl Lilo-chan (ep. 3)
Bobobo-bo Bo-bobo, Usa-chan the Rabbit
Mermaid Melody: Pichi Pichi Pitch, Female Student A (ep. 37), Girl A (ep. 22)
Wandaba Style, Ayame Akimo
Last Exile, Lavie Head

2004
Uta∽Kata, Yuka (ep. 4)
Gakuen Alice, Sumire Shoda & Yoichi "Yo-chan" Hijiri
Keroro Gunsou, Natsumi Hinata
Samurai 7, Komachi Mikumari
Desert Punk, Kosuna
Tsukuyomi: Moon Phase, Hazuki/Luna
DearS, Neneko Izumi
Ninja Nonsense, Midori (ep. 2)
Maria Watches Over Us, Mami Yamaguchi
Maria Watches Over Us Season 2: Printemps, Mami Yamaguchi
Midori Days, Seiji Sawamura (young)

2005
Aria the Animation, Aika S. Granzchesta, Asuna (ep. 12)
The Law of Ueki, Tenko (small)
Gaiking, Telmina
Kamichu!, Tama
GUNxSWORD, Melissa
Ginban Kaleidoscope, Yohko Sakurano
Best Student Council, Kaori Izumi
Blood+, Lulu
Hell Girl, Haruka Yasuda (ep. 6)
Zettai Shonen, Miku Miyama
Pani Poni Dash!, Rebecca "Becky" Miyamoto
PetoPeto-san, Chie Oohashi
One Piece, Chimney

2006
Aria The Natural, Aika S. Granzchesta
Fairy Musketeers, Cane
Canvas 2: Niji Iro no Sketch, Girl (ep. 22)
Kirarin Revolution, Aoi Kirisawa
Gintama, Kuriko Matsudaira
Ballad of a Shinigami, Mai Makihara
Strawberry Panic!, Chiyo Tsukidate
009-1, Freya (ep. 4)
Chocotto Sister, Eriko Odawara
Demashitaa! Powerpuff Girls Z, Kuriko Akatsutsumi
Tokimeki Memorial ~Only Love~, Store Girl
Negima!?, Anya, Motsu
Nishi no Yoki Majo Astraea Testament, Adel Roland
Pumpkin Scissors, Septieme Rodelia (ep. 13)
Disgaea, Jennifer
Yoshinaga-san'chi no Gargoyle, Futaba Yoshinaga
Wan Wan Serebu Soreyuke! Tetsunoshin, Meg

2007
Mobile Suit Gundam 00, Louise Halevy
Shining Tears X Wind, Houmei
Zombie-Loan, Yuuta
Baccano!, Carol
Hitohira, Minoru Yamaguchi, Student Council President
Magical Girl Lyrical Nanoha StrikerS, Subaru Nakajima
Mokke, Kazama
Romeo × Juliet, Regan

2008
Aria the Origination, Aika S. Granzchesta
Allison & Lillia, Merielle
Kaiba, Chronico
Kanokon, Akane Asahina
Mobile Suit Gundam 00 Second Season, Louise Halevy
Linebarrels of Iron, Rachel Calvin
Gegege no Kitarō, Kumi (ep. 67)
Kemeko Deluxe!, Kemeko
Zoku Sayonara Zetsubō Sensei , Meru Otonashi (ep. 6)
Strike Witches, Francesca Lucchini
Soul Eater, Kim Diehl
The Tower of Druaga: The Aegis of Uruk, Mite (ep. 12)
Bamboo Blade, Shinobu Toyama (ep. 26)
Hidamari Sketch × 365, Chocolat (ep. 8)
Pocket Monsters: Diamond & Pearl,  Taisei (ep. 80)
xxxHOLiC: Kei, Female Student A (ep. 10)
Rosario + Vampire Capu2, Kokoa Shuzen

2009
Kobato., Kohaku
Sasameki Koto, Miyako Taema
07-Ghost, Kuroyuri
Tegami Bachi: Letter Bee,  Sonja (ep. 12)
The Tower of Druaga: the Sword of Uruk, Mite the Fool
Bakemonogatari, Hitagi Senjougahara
Maria Watches Over Us 4th Season, Mami Yamaguchi
One Piece, Boa Sandersonia

2010
Arakawa Under the Bridge, Kou "Riku" Ichinomiya (young), Stella
Arakawa Under the Bridge × Bridge, Stella
Ikki Tousen: Xtreme Xecutor, Shikou Soujin
InuYasha: The Final Act, Miroku (young)
Star Driver, Mami Yano
Strike Witches 2, Francesca Lucchini
Dance in the Vampire Bund, Yuki Saegusa
Hanamaru Kindergarten, Mayumi
Pocket Monsters: Diamond & Pearl, Nobuko
Mitsudomoe, Miku Sugisaki

2011
Astarotte's Toy, Ingrid "Ini" Sorveig Sorgríms
Mobile Suit Gundam AGE, Riria (eps 6-8)
Horizon in the Middle of Nowhere, Kimi Aoi
Gintama', Kuriko Matsudaira
C3, Sovereignty
Tamayura - Hitotose, Shimako Tobita (eps 7-9)
Phi-Brain - Puzzle of God, Maze, Kaito Daimon (young)
Puella Magi Madoka Magica, Homura Akemi
Mitsudomoe Zōryōchū!, Miku Sugisaki
Last Exile: Fam, The Silver Wing, Teddy
 Saki: Achiga-hen episode of Side-A - Awai Oohoshi

2012
Horizon in the Middle of Nowhere II, Kimi Aoi
Kuroko's Basketball, Riko Aida
Gon, Ani
Shining Hearts, Xiao Mei
Jewelpet Kira Deco—!, Eclan
Sword Art Online, Alicia Rue
Daily Lives of High School Boys, Ikushima
Natsuiro Kiseki, Ishida
Nisemonogatari, Hitagi Senjōgahara
YuruYuri, Nadeshiko Ōmuro
Last Exile: Fam, The Silver Wing, Anand (eps 12-13), Emma (ep. 18), Lavie Head (eps 15.5-21), Luscinia (15 years old; ep. 11)

2013
Dog & Scissors, Sara Moribe
Infinite Stratos 2, Tatenashi Sarashiki
Gundam Build Fighters, Caroline Yajima
Kyousogiga, Doctor Shōko & Yakushimaru
Silver Spoon, Tamako's Mother (ep. 7)
Sasami-san@Ganbaranai, Tsurugi Yagami
Stella Women's Academy, High School Division Class C3, Honoka Mutsu
Tamagotchi! Miracle Friends, Clulutchi
Danganronpa: The Animation, Aoi Asahina
Namiuchigiwa no Muromi-san, Yeti
Phi Brain - Kami no Puzzle, Kaito Daimon (young)
Photo Kano, Nonoka Masaki
Blood Lad, Mamejirō
BlazBlue Alter Memory, Taokaka
Maoyū Maō Yūsha, Head Maid
Monogatari Series Second Season, Hitagi Senjōgahara
Problem Children Are Coming from Another World, Aren't They?, Pest
One Piece Episode of Merry: Mō Hitori no Nakama no Monogatari, Chimney

2014
Yona of the Dawn, Yona
Gugure! Kokkuri-san, Inugami (Female)
keroro, Natsumi Hinata
Seitokai Yakuindomo*, Uomi
World Conquest Zvezda Plot, Natasha's Mother (ep. 4)
Soul Eater Not!, Kim Diehl
Tsukimonogatari, Hitagi Senjōgahara
D-Frag!, Chitose Karasuyama
No-Rin, Natsumi "Becky" Bekki
Nobunagun, Geronimo
Chaika - The Coffin Princess, Frederica
Chaika - The Coffin Princess Avenging Battle, Frederica
Fate/kaleid liner Prisma Illya 2wei!, Chloe Von Einzbern
Broken Blade, Sigyn Erster
The Irregular at Magic High School, Maya Yotsuba
Log Horizon, Nureha

2015
Tantei Kageki Milky Holmes TD, Setsuko Yasubashi (ep. 4)
Fate/kaleid liner Prisma Illya 2wei Herz!, Chloe Von Einzbern
Magical Girl Lyrical Nanoha ViVid, Nove Nakajima
Snow White with the Red Hair, Kihal Toghrul
Aria the Scarlet Ammo AA, Tō Sumitsu
Owarimonogatari, Hitagi Senjōgahara
YuruYuri San Hai!, Nadeshiko Ōmuro

2016
Rewrite, Kotori Kanbe
Fate/kaleid liner Prisma Illya 3rei!!, Chloe von Einzbern
Danganronpa 3: The End of Kibōgamine Gakuen, Aoi Asahina
The Great Passage, Remi Miyoshi
Mahou Tsukai PreCure!, Francois
Vivid Strike!, Nove Nakajima

2017
Berserk, Schierke
Land of the Lustrous, Ventricosus
Owarimonogatari 2nd Season, Hitagi Senjougahara

2018
Lord of Vermilion: The Crimson King, Chiyu
Zoku Owarimonogatari, Hitagi Senjougahara
One Piece, Charlotte Flampe

2019
Bermuda Triangle: Colorful Pastral, Léger
Strike Witches 501st Unit, Taking Off!, Francesca Lucchini

2020
I'm Standing on a Million Lives, Kahabell

2021
Kaginado, Kotori Kanbe
Demon Slayer: Kimetsu no Yaiba, Koinatsu

2023
Handyman Saitō in Another World, Lavella

Tokusatsu
2008
Tomica Hero: Rescue Force, Maen (eps. 28-49), Dark Commander Voice
Tomica Hero: Rescue Force Explosive Movie: Rescue the Mach Train!, Maen

2020
Ganbareiwa!! Robocon: Urara~! Koi Suru Shiru-Nashi Tantanmen!! no Maki, Robocon (voice)

Original video animation
Canary (2002), Hoshino Mai
Dai Mahō-Tōge (2002), Paya-tan
Pinky:st (2006), Mei
Maria-sama ga Miteru OVA (2006), Mami Yamaguchi
Strike Witches OVA (2007), Francesca Lucchini
Murder Princess (2007), Ana and Yuna
ARIA The OVA ~ARIETTA~ (2007), Aika S. Granzchesta
Mahō Sensei Negima! ~Shiroki Tsubasa Ala Alba~ (2008), Anya
Book Girl Memoir (2010), young Inoue Konoha
Fate/prototype (2011), Reiroukan Misaya
Maken-ki! (2013), Takeko Oyama
Senran Kagura: Estival Versus - Festival Eve Full of Swimsuits (2015), Imu
Akatsuki no Yona OVA (2015-2016), Yona
Learning With Manga! F/GO (2018), Tamamo-no-Mae

Original net animation
Double Circle (2013), Nanoha
Ninja Slayer From Animation (2015), Nancy Lee
Koyomimonogatari (2016), Senjougahara Hitagi
Obsolete (2020), Nanami Nanahoshi

Drama CDNishi no Yoki Majo - Astraea Testament, Adel RolandGosick, Victorica de BloisShitateya Koubou ~Artelier Collection, UufTokyo*Innocent, YuzuWild Life (manga), InuGetBackers "TARGET B" (2003), Rena SendoGetBackers "TARGET G" (2003), Rena SendoLucky Star (2005), Yui NarumiSaint Seiya Episode.G (2007), Lithos ChrysalisFate/Kaleid liner Prisma Illya 2wei (2011), KuroAkatsuki no Yona (2012), Yona

Video gamesDisgaea: Hour of Darkness (2003), JenniferKunoichi (2003), HisuiLucky Star Moe Drill (2005), Yui NarumiWhite Princess the Second (2005), RenaBrave Story: New Traveler (2006), MeenaPersona 3 FES (2006), MetisTrusty Bell: Chopin no Yume (2007), MarchLuminous Arc (2007), MelMagician's Academy (2007), TanarotteSoul Nomad & the World Eaters (2007), DanetteARIA the ORIGINATION ~ Aoi Hoshi no El Cielo ~ (2008), Aika S. GranzchestaBlazBlue: Calamity Trigger (2008), TaokakaBlazer Drive (2008), TamakiBleach: Heat the Soul 5 (2008), SennaMakai Senki Disgaea 3: Absence of Justice (2008), Raspberyl and AsagiBlazBlue: Continuum Shift (2009), TaokakaBleach: Heat the Soul 6 (2009), SennaPhantasy Star Portable 2 (2009), EmiliaTales of Vesperia (2009), Patty FleurCastlevania: Harmony of Despair (2010), Maria RenardDanganronpa: Academy of Hope and High School Students of Despair (2010), Aoi AsahinaFate/Extra (2010), Caster/Tamamo no MaeRewrite (2011), Kotori KanbeRune Factory 4 (2011), FreyMugen Souls (2012), BelleriaPhoto Kano (2012), Nonoka MasakiSol Trigger (2012), FranTears to Tiara II (2013), IzebelAkiba's Trip 2 (2013), Toko SagisakaFate/Extra CCC (2013), Caster/Tamamo no MaeDrakengard 3 (2013), TwoSenran Kagura Shinovi Versus (2013), ImuGranblue Fantasy (2014), De La FilleSenran Kagura: Estival Versus (2015), ImuFate/Grand Order (2015), Tamamo no Mae, Chevalier D'Eon, Boudica, Tamamo Cat, Tamamo Vitch/Koyanskaya, Chloe von Einzbern
 League of Legends (2015), Orianna (Japanese dub)Overwatch (2016), Sombra (Japanese dub)Berserk and the Band of the Hawk (2016), Schierke
Fate/Extella: The Umbral Star (2016), Caster/Tamamo no Mae
Onmyoji (2016), Ushi no KokumairiSenko no Ronde 2 (2017), Ernula
Magia Record (2017), Homura Akemi and Hitagi Senjougahara (Madogatari Crossover)Infinite Stratos: Archetype Breaker (2017), Tatenashi SarashikiXenoblade Chronicles 2 (2017), AzamiAzur Lane (2018), Ashigara, KongouKing's Raid (2018), AishaMajsoul (2018), Miki Nikaidō, Nadeshiko (Japanese dub)Super Smash Bros. Ultimate (2018), Mii Fighter (Type 6)Identity V (2018), Gardener/Emma WoodsArknights (2019), MayerAnother Eden (2019), TsubameAsh Arms (2019), Semovente M40, Fw 190A-1Death end re;Quest 2 (2020), Mai TouyamaGenshin Impact (2020), JeanThe Legend of Heroes: Kuro no Kiseki (2021), Elaine AuclairBlue Archive (2021), Kosaka WakamoArtery Gear: Fusion (2022), Alice, NemophilaThe Legend of Heroes: Kuro no Kiseki II – Crimson Sin (2022), Elaine Auclair

FilmsBleach: Memories of Nobody (2006), SennaBrave Story (2006), MiinaKeroro Gunsō the Super Movie (2006), Natsumi HinataKeroro Gunso the Super Movie 2: The Deep. Sea Princess (2007), Natsumi HinataKeroro Gunso the Super Movie 3: Keroro vs. Keroro Great Sky Duel (2008), Natsumi HinataTomica Hero: Rescue Force (2008), Maaen (voice)Book Girl (2010), Inoue Konoha (young)009 RE:CYBORG (2012), Françoise ArnoulPuella Magi Madoka Magica films (2012-2013), Homura AkemiStrike Witches: The Movie (2012), Francesca LucchiniAura: Maryūinkōga Saigo no Tatakai (2013), HinoKuroko's Basketball The Movie: Last Game (2017), Riko AidaFate/kaleid liner Prisma Illya: Vow in the Snow (2017), Chloe Von EinzbernFate/kaleid liner Prisma Illya: Licht - The Nameless Girl (2021), Chloe Von Einzbern

Dubbing
Live-actionFamous in Love, Alexis GlennTriloquist, Robin Patterson (Katie Chonacas)

AnimationKid vs. Kat, Cooper "Coop" BurtonburgerTinpo, HackpoWalking with Dinosaurs, JuniperThe Loud House - Lincoln LoudThe Casagrandes - Lincoln Loud

OmakeMaria-sama ni wa naisho (2004), Mami Yamaguchi

Other voicesStar Tours – The Adventures Continue'' at Tokyo Disneyland – Princess Leia

References

External links

 at I'm Enterprise 
Chiwa Saito at Ryu's Seiyuu Info

1981 births
Living people
Voice actresses from Saitama Prefecture
Japanese voice actresses
I'm Enterprise voice actors